Cropia or Kropia or Cropeia or Kropeia (Κρωπειά), also known as Cropidae or Kropidai,  was a deme (or suburb/subdivision) of ancient Attica.

The site of Cropia is located west of modern Ano Liosia.

References

Populated places in ancient Attica
Former populated places in Greece
Demoi